Dulovo may refer to:

 Dulovo, Bulgaria, a town
 Dulovo, Slovakia, a village
 Dulovo, Ukraine, a village